Waterford City Library, also known as the Central Library, is a public library in Waterford, Ireland.  It was the first to be built of Ireland's many Carnegie libraries. The philanthropist Andrew Carnegie, who had previously opened libraries in Scotland and the US, himself laid the foundation stone in 1903.

Architecture
The classical-style building was constructed on a corner site using Kilkenny limestone.  It is a protected structure. In 2004 the library was reopened after having been renovated for its centenary.

Exhibition
Images of the library were featured at the Venice Biennale of Architecture of 2008.
The title of the exhibition in question, "Lives of Spaces", was intended to elicit multiple interpretations, "suggesting that, while spaces can contain many lives, they can equally live many lives themselves".

See also
Carnegie went on to fund four more libraries in County Waterford:
Ballyduff,
Cappoquin, 
Lismore
Tallow

References

External links
 http://www.waterfordcity.ie/library/centrallibrary.htm

Buildings and structures in Waterford (city)
Carnegie libraries in Ireland
Libraries in the Republic of Ireland
Library buildings completed in 1904
20th-century architecture in the Republic of Ireland
Libraries established in 1904